Rudolf Trenkwitz (born 30 January 1906, date of death unknown) was an Austrian equestrian. He competed in two events at the 1936 Summer Olympics.

References

External links

1906 births
Year of death missing
Austrian male equestrians
Olympic equestrians of Austria
Equestrians at the 1936 Summer Olympics
Place of birth missing